Marrubium (horehound or hoarhound) is a genus of flowering plants in the family Lamiaceae, native to temperate regions of Europe, North Africa, and Asia as far east as the Xinjiang region of western China. A few species are also naturalized in North and South America.

Species
Marrubium alyssoides Pomel – Algeria, Morocco
Marrubium alysson L. – Mediterranean from Spain + Morocco to Palestine
Marrubium anisodon K.Koch – Greece, Albania, Crimea, southwest Asia from Turkey to Kashmir
Marrubium aschersonii Magnus – Tunisia
Marrubium astracanicum Jacq. – Caucasus, Iran, Iraq, Turkey
Marrubium atlanticum Batt. – Morocco
Marrubium ayardii Maire – Morocco
Marrubium × bastetanum Coincy – Spain   (M. supinum × M. vulgare)
Marrubium bourgaei Boiss. – Turkey
Marrubium catariifolium Desr. – Caucasus, Turkey
Marrubium cephalanthum Boiss. & Noë  – Turkey
Marrubium cordatum Nábelek – Iran, Iraq, Turkey
Marrubium crassidens Boiss. – Iran, Iraq
Marrubium cuneatum Banks & Sol. – Iran, Iraq, Turkey, Syria, Lebanon, Palestine
Marrubium cylleneum Boiss. & Heldr.  – Greece
Marrubium depauperatum Boiss. & Balansa – Turkey
Marrubium duabense Murata – Iran, Afghanistan
Marrubium echinatum Ball – Morocco
Marrubium eriocephalum Seybold – Iraq
Marrubium fontianum Maire – Rif in northern Morocco
Marrubium friwaldskyanum Boiss. – Bulgaria
Marrubium glechomifolium Freyn & Conrath – Caucasus
Marrubium globosum Montbret & Aucher ex Benth. – Turkey, Syria, Lebanon
Marrubium heterocladum Emb. & Maire – Rif in northern Morocco
Marrubium heterodon (Benth.) Boiss. & Balansa – Turkey
Marrubium hierapolitanum Mouterde – Syria
Marrubium × humbertii Emb. & Maire – Morocco     (M. ayardii × M. multibracteatum)
Marrubium incanum Desr. – Italy (including Sicily + Sardinia), Greece, Albania, Yugoslavia, Bulgaria 
Marrubium leonuroides Desr.  – Caucasus, Crimea
Marrubium litardierei Marmey – Morocco
Marrubium lutescens Boiss. & Heldr. – Turkey
Marrubium multibracteatum Humbert & Maire – Morocco
Marrubium × paniculatum Desr. – Austria, Czech Republic, Yugoslavia   (M. peregrinum × M. vulgare)
Marrubium parviflorum Fisch. & C.A.Mey. – Turkey, Iran, Caucasus
Marrubium peregrinum L. – central + Eastern Europe, Turkey, Caucasus
Marrubium persicum C.A.Mey – Turkey, Iran, Caucasus
Marrubium pestalozzae Boiss. – Greece, Bulgaria, Romania, Moldova, Ukraine, Crimea
Marrubium plumosum C.A.Mey. – Caucasus
Marrubium procerum Bunge – Iran
Marrubium propinquum Fisch. & C.A.Mey. – Iran, Caucasus
Marrubium rotundifolia Boiss. – Turkey
Marrubium sivasense Aytaç, Akgül & Ekici – Turkey
Marrubium supinum L. – Spain, Morocco, Algeria, Tunisia
Marrubium thessalum Boiss. & Heldr.  – Albania, Greece
Marrubium trachyticum Boiss. – Turkey
Marrubium vanense Hub.-Mor. – Turkey
Marrubium velutinum Sm. – Greece
Marrubium vulcanicum Hub.-Mor. – Turkey
Marrubium vulgare L. – White horehound or common horehound – widespread from Denmark + Azores + Canary Islands east to Xingiang; naturalized in New Zealand, New Caledonia, Hawaii, Easter Island, North + South America

The genus name Marrubium derives from the Latin word marrubii, meaning horehound. The French Talmudic exegete, Rashi, thinks that this herb may have been used as one of the bitter herbs on the night of Passover. The common English name horehound is of unknown origin, but with the first part 'hore' derived from "hoary", "hairy".

The species formerly classified as Marrubium nigrum (Black Horehound) is now placed in the genus Ballota.

Marrubium species are used as food plants by the larvae of some Lepidoptera species including Coleophora lineolea.

References

 
Taxa named by Carl Linnaeus
Lamiaceae genera